Şirvanlı Mehmed Rüşdi Pasha (1828–1874) was an Ottoman statesman. He was Grand Vizier of the Ottoman Empire from 15 April 1873 until 15 February 1874.

References 

1828 births
1874 deaths
19th-century Grand Viziers of the Ottoman Empire
Turkish people of Azerbaijani descent